Bernhard Franz Karl Adolf von Hülsen (20 April 1865 – 21 April 1950) was a German general.

He was the son of Prussian colonel lieutenant Hermann von Hülsen (1816–1867) and his second wife Helene, née von Clausewitz. Walter von Hülsen (1863–1947), later general of infantry, was his older brother.

Hülsen married Magdalene von Schaper on 31 July 1896 in Berlin.

On 26 December 1918 after World War I, Hülsen formed the Freikorps (von) Hülsen, a paramilitary unit that participated in the suppression of the Spartacist League in Berlin. In 1921, Generalleutnant von Hülsen commanded units in the Battle of Annaberg in Upper Silesia. In 1922, he published Der Kampf um Oberschlesien.

References

External links
Freikorps Hülsen

1865 births
1950 deaths
People from Kędzierzyn-Koźle
20th-century Freikorps personnel
Major generals of Prussia
German Army generals of World War I
German untitled nobility
German military writers
Lieutenant generals of the Reichswehr
German male non-fiction writers